The Peter J. Cutino Award, named after former college water polo player and UC Berkeley coach Peter J. Cutino, is considered the most prestigious individual award in American collegiate water polo. It is given annually to the top male and female player in the National Collegiate Athletic Association (NCAA).

History 
The award was first presented in 1999 by the Trustees of The Olympic Club in San Francisco. The Club, founded in 1860 to support amateur athletics in the Bay Area, is one of America's oldest athletic clubs. Nominees for the Cutino Award are selected by the Division I water polo coaches. These coaches vote for three players as nominees, none of which can be members of their own team. The eventual winner is voted on again by the same coaches, who now rank the nominees and can vote for members of their own teams. The Olympic Club, which tabulates the votes, does not release the number of votes to avoid manipulation of the totals. Each winner receives a brass and walnut trophy, and the perpetual trophy is on display at the Olympic Club of San Francisco.

Originally the award was announced after the end of both the men's (December) and women's (May) college seasons. Former major league baseball commissioner and US Olympic Committee chair Peter Ueberroth, himself once a water polo player at San Jose State, presented the first awards on January 22, 2000. The 2001 women's winner, Coralie Simmons, was presented with her award almost a year after her season had ended because the Trustees decided to change the cycle to coincide with the academic year. Thus in June 2002, Simmons won the 2001 award, while Brenda Villa received the 2002 women's Cutino at the same ceremony. The nominees are now announced each spring, before the end of the women's NCAA water polo season, but well after the men's season ends in December of the prior year. The award ceremony is held at an Olympic Club facility in San Francisco, shortly after the Women's NCAA Championship is decided.

Peter J. Cutino Award winners 

(Source: Olympic Club)
(Source: Swimming World Magazine)
(Source: Swimming World Magazine)

Notes

See also 
 USA Water Polo Hall of Fame

External links
NCAA Water Polo
 The Olympic Club of San Francisco
Swimming World Magazine

Water polo in the United States
College sports trophies and awards in the United States
Water polo trophies and awards